The Notes is a novel by Nobel Prize-winning author José Saramago. It was first published in 1976.

References

Novels by José Saramago
1976 novels
20th-century Portuguese novels
Portuguese-language novels